The men's 200 metre obstacle event was an obstacle swimming event in the 1900 Summer Olympics held in Paris. It was held on 11 August and 12 August 1900. Twelve swimmers from five nations competed. The event was won by Frederick Lane of Australia, with Otto Wahle of Austria second and Peter Kemp of Great Britain third. Lane had already won the 200 metre freestyle (with no obstacles).

Background

This was the only appearance of obstacle swimming at the Olympics.

Competition format

There were three obstacles throughout the 200 metre course. Swimmers had to climb over the first two (a pole and a row of boats), and swim under the third (another row of boats).

This swimming event used freestyle swimming, which means that the method of the stroke is not regulated (unlike backstroke, breaststroke, and butterfly events). The event consisted of two rounds: semifinals and a final. There were three semifinals, with 4 swimmers in each; the top 2 swimmers in each semifinal advanced to the final along with the 4 with the best times from the remaining swimmers. This made a 10-person final.

Schedule

Results

Semifinals

The two fastest swimmers in each heat as well as the four fastest losers from across the three heats advanced. This meant that 10 of the 12 swimmers moved on to the final.

Semifinal 1

Semifinal 2

Semifinal 3

Final

The final was held on 12 August.

References

Swimming at the 1900 Summer Olympics